Horace Sheffield III (born December 28, 1954) is an American pastor and media personality. As of 2018 he resides in Detroit, Michigan, where he is an on-air radio personality for 1200 AM/WCHB, as the host of On The Line and an on-air television personality for Channel 38/WADL, as the host of Real Talk Weekly. Sheffield is also the Pastor of New Destiny Christian Fellowship, which has churches in Detroit and Brooklyn, New York.

Sheffield as of 2018 serves as the Co-Chair of the MDP Community Democratic Caucus.

Personal life
Sheffield was born in Detroit, Michigan. He is the son of Mary (née Otto), and Rev. Horace Sheffield, Jr., a supervisor at Ford Motor Company. The elder Sheffield fought to create the UAW's Inter-Racial Committee. Later, he was instrumental in helping stage the legendary April 1941 workers strike at Ford.

Sheffield is the father of Detroit City Council President Pro Tem Mary Sheffield.

Education
After graduating Cass Tech High School, Sheffield attended Wayne State University, where he received his B.A. in History & English Sheffield later attended the University of Michigan Dearborn, receiving his Masters in Public Administration in 1995

In 2000, the University of Michigan awarded Sheffield its "African American Alumni Affiliate Alumnus of the Year" award.

In 2016, the University of Michigan awarded Sheffield its "Making A Difference (M.A.D.)" Award . The award honors alumni who have made significant contributions to their community and/or career through their time, actions, talents and dedication.

Community activism
Sheffield is the CEO of the Detroit Association of Black Organizations, Chairman of the Detroit Ecumenical Ministers Alliance and Founder/Former President of both the Detroit and Michigan Chapters of the National Action Network.

Sheffield also founded the Detroit Cares Alternative Academy. The privately run academy, under contract with Detroit Public Schools, receives its funding from the district. Traditional academic courses are taught alongside cosmetology, building trades and culinary arts.

In 2003, Sheffield co-wrote a letter with Al Sharpton to American Honda, complaining that the company did not hire enough African-Americans in management. "We support those that support us," the letter said. "We cannot be silent while African-Americans spend hard-earned dollars with a company that does not hire, promote or do business with us in a statistically significant manner."

In 2009, Sheffield spearheaded the National Black Leadership Commission. The conference brought together religious, political and labor leaders, in hopes of promoting a Congressional bill that would help tackle the spread of the virus in at-risk communities.

Sheffield served as a member of the organizing committee for the 2009 NCAA Final Four, that was hosted at Ford Field in Detroit.

In 2010, Sheffield called for Michigan's Attorney General, Mike Cox, to apologize over remarks Cox made about Rev. Al Sharpton eulogizing 7-year-old Aiyana Stanley-Jones, who was killed in a police raid. Cox stated that he was disgusted by the planned appearance of Sharpton at the funeral and accused the New York minister of a "drive-by at the scene of a tragedy."

In 2016, Sheffield started the "Bust the Ball" campaign, which held protests August 17 in Detroit, and on August 29th in New York. His main complaint was that the NBA was engaging in "Green-lining," economically excluding people of color beyond the basketball court. Sheffield stated that he decided to form a protest after  he reached out to the NBA, including Commissioner Adam Silver, as well as the Pistons and Palace Sports & Entertainment vice chairman Arn Tellem, with no response.

On Christmas morning 2016, a man left a message on a New Destiny Christian Fellowship prayer hotline, using racial slurs and threatening to firebomb Sheffield's church.

In 2017, Sheffield and the Detroit Association of Black Organizations paid half the cost for a Detroit gas station to participate in Project Green Light. The project allows the Detroit Police Department to tap into surveillance cameras at participating locations, to monitor what is going on. Participation hinges on the location being equipped with city-approved cameras and lights, which costs $5,000 up front.

Political career
In 1979, Sheffield was a founding co-chair of The Commission for the Advancement of Policy Affecting Youth, the Disadvantaged and the Poor. It was the first nationwide, youth led attempt to increase African-American voter registration. Commission members included LeVar Burton and Michael Jackson.

In 2014, Sheffield was called by a federal grand jury to talk about what he knew regarding efforts to influence the selection of Detroit City Council leaders. The FBI was investigating rumors that Thomas Hardiman, President and CEO of A&H Contractors, was reportedly trying to bribe Detroit City Council members, in an attempt to influence the outcome of the vote for Council President. Sheffield said he was angry because Hardiman approached his daughter, Councilwoman Mary Sheffield, about the vote.

2014 13th Congressional District Primary Election
In April 2014, Sheffield filed to run in the Democratic Primary Election for Michigan's 13th Congressional District, against incumbent John Conyers.

Michigan election law states that a Congressional candidate can only qualify to appear on a ballot via a nominating petition. Since 1966, anyone that collects, or signs, nominating petitions must be a registered voter within the Congressional District. The petitions must be filed with the Secretary of State by the stated deadline, in order to appear on the August primary election ballot. Candidates currently need 1,000 signatures in order to qualify.

At the deadline, Conyers campaign had submitted nearly 2,000 signed nominating petitions to the Wayne County Clerk's office, almost double the amount needed. Election officials invalidated hundreds of Conyers petitions for violations, such as incorrect voter addresses, leaving Conyers with approximately 1,200 signed petitions. The Detroit News reported that two of Conyers petition gatherers were not registered voters, while two others were not registered voters until the week of the report, meaning they collected signatures when they were not registered voters. These irregularities came to light when Sheffield challenged the signatures.

Wayne County Clerk Cathy Garrett ruled that the signatures gathered by those men were invalid, invalidating another 644 signed petitions. This left Conyers with only 592 valid signatures, hundreds of signatures short of the legal requirement.

Conyers, along with the ACLU filed a Federal lawsuit that challenged the Michigan law that required petition circulators to be registered voters. They argued that the law was unconstitutional, since petition gathering is political speech and voter registration is not a requirement to exercise First Amendment rights. Detroit Federal District Judge Matthew Leittman agreed and placed Conyers back on the ballot.

On August 5, 2014, John Conyers won the primary election, receiving 86% of the vote.

Electoral history

External links

References 

Living people
1954 births
Clergy from Detroit
Wayne State University alumni
University of Michigan alumni
Michigan Democrats
Politicians from Detroit
21st-century American politicians
American male writers
American talk radio hosts
American television talk show hosts
Radio personalities from Detroit
African-American radio personalities
African-American television personalities
African-American television producers
African-American television talk show hosts
African-American writers
African-American people in Michigan politics
Film producers from Michigan
21st-century African-American politicians
20th-century African-American people
Television producers from Michigan
African-American male writers